Foreword is the second extended play (EP) and debut major-label release by American singer and songwriter Tori Kelly. It serves as her first release after being signed to Capitol Records in September 2013. The EP was released on October 22, 2013, through the label.

The EP was preceded by the single "Dear No One", which was released as iTunes' "Free Single of the Week" on October 23, 2013. Foreword debuted and peaked at number 16 on the US Billboard 200.

Composition

In September 2013, it was announced that Kelly had signed to Capitol Records, after hiring Scooter Braun as her manager. That same month, she announced that her major-label debut would be released in October. In an interview with Vibe, Kelly stated that the EP has a "double meaning", and a representation of a succession from her debut Handmade Songs by Tori Kelly (2012). Forewords material was described by Elle as a mixture of pop, R&B, and soul music. Kelly said that every track was composed in different way; some in her bedroom, some with guitar in hand. Her favorite track on the EP from a writing perspective is "Paper Hearts".

Promotion
To promote Foreword, Kelly was the sole supporting act for Ed Sheeran at his Madison Square Garden show in November 2013. On December 12, 2013, she appeared on The Queen Latifah Show, where she spoke about the EP and performed "Dear No One".

Singles
"Dear No One" was released on October 23, 2013 as the EP's lead single. It was also featured as the iTunes Store's "Free Single of the Week" for October 23.

Critical reception
Critic Mark Deming said that the release gave "a new sophistication to her sound without interfering with her subtle, emotionally expressive power as a vocalist and songwriter."

Track listing

Charts

Release history

References

2013 EPs
Tori Kelly albums
Capitol Records EPs